Manuela Schwerzmann (born 5 August 1976) is a Swiss former professional tennis player.

Schwerzmann toured internationally as a junior in 1993 and 1994, during which time she appeared in the occasional professional tournament, but didn't pursue a tennis career beyond this. She played in the juniors at Wimbledon.

In 1994 she featured in a tie for the Switzerland Federation Cup team, against Canada in Frankfurt. Her only appearance came in a doubles dead rubber partnering Miroslava Vavrinec, which they lost to Jill Hetherington and Rene Simpson.

See also
List of Switzerland Fed Cup team representatives

References

External links
 
 
 

1976 births
Living people
Swiss female tennis players